My Favorite Spy may refer to:
 My Favorite Spy (1942 film), an American comedy film
 My Favorite Spy (1951 film), an American comedy film